James Michael Johnson (born January 30, 1972) is an American attorney, politician, and former talk radio host serving as the U.S. representative for Louisiana's 4th congressional district. First elected in 2016, he is the vice chair of the House Republican Conference. He previously chaired the House Republican Study Committee, the largest caucus of conservatives in Congress, and a coalition of socially and fiscally conservative members of the larger House Republican Conference.

From 2015 to 2017, Johnson served as a representative in the Louisiana House of Representatives for the 8th district in Bossier Parish.

Early life and education
Johnson was born in Shreveport, the oldest of four children of Jeanne Johnson and James Patrick Johnson, a firefighter who founded the nonprofit organization the Percy R. Johnson Burn Foundation, named after his partner Percy R. Johnson, the city's first African-American fire instructor and captain, who died in the line of duty. Johnson's father was also critically burned and disabled in the line of duty during the fire. Johnson has two brothers, Chris and Josh, and a sister, Laura. Johnson's maternal grandfather, Nunzio Messina, was from Italy, and he has some French and Irish ancestry on his father's side of the family.

In high school, Johnson was a member of Louisiana Boys State. He graduated from Captain Shreve High School in Shreveport. He received an undergraduate degree in business administration from Louisiana State University in Baton Rouge. He holds a Juris Doctor from Louisiana State University Law Center, and worked as a  constitutional attorney in Benton, Louisiana.

Legal career
Before his election to Congress, Johnson was a partner in the Kitchens Law Firm and a senior attorney and national media spokesman for the Alliance Defense Fund, now known as Alliance Defending Freedom.

Johnson was also formerly chief counsel of the nonprofit law firm Freedom Guard.

Johnson served as a trustee of the Ethics and Religious Liberty Commission within the Southern Baptist Convention from 2004 to 2012.

Louisiana House of Representatives

Louisiana Marriage and Conscience Act
In April 2015, Johnson proposed the Marriage and Conscience Act, a bill similar in content to Indiana's controversial Religious Freedom Restoration Act passed a few days earlier, though Johnson denied that his legislation was based on the Indiana law.

Johnson's Marriage and Conscience Act would have eliminated Louisiana's ability to withhold a "state license, certification, accreditation, employment, state contracts, state benefits, or tax deductions" from a person or entity based on their views on the institution of marriage. Critics denounced the bill as an attempt to protect people who discriminate against same-sex married couples.

Then-Governor Bobby Jindal pledged to sign Johnson's bill into law if it passed both houses of the legislature. IBM and other employers in the region expressed their opposition to the bill, including concerns about the hiring difficulties it would likely produce. Other politicians also objected, including Baton Rouge Metro Councilman John Delgado, a fellow Republican, who called Johnson a "despicable bigot of the highest order" for proposing the bill.

On May 19, 2015, the House Civil Law and Procedure Committee voted 10–2 to table the bill, effectively ending its chances to become law. Both Republicans and Democrats voted against the bill; other than Johnson, only Republican Ray Garofalo voted for it. After the bill was tabled, Jindal said that he would issue an executive order to enforce its intent. Johnson planned to reintroduce his own bill in 2016.

Other
Johnson voted against a one-cent increase in Louisiana's sales tax.

In 2015 and 2016 Johnson led an anti-abortion "Life March" in Shreveport-Bossier City.

Johnson opposed the Common Core State Standards Initiative.

U.S House of Representatives

Elections

2016
On February 10, 2016, Johnson announced his candidacy for the 4th congressional district seat held for eight years by John Fleming, who was running for the United States Senate seat vacated by David Vitter. He won the election.

2018
In 2018, Johnson won his second term in the U.S. House with 139,307 votes (64%). Democrat Ryan Trundle trailed with 72,923 (34%).

2020
In 2020, Johnson won his third term in the House with 185,265 votes (60%) to Democratic nominee Kenny Houston's 78,157 (25%).

Tenure
Johnson was sworn into office on January 3, 2017. He is Vice Chairman of the Republican Conference, an Assistant Whip for House Republicans, a member of the Judiciary Committee, the Armed Services Committee, and a member and former Chairman of the Republican Study Committee.

Johnson voted for the American Health Care Act of 2017.

In December 2017, Johnson voted for the Tax Cuts and Jobs Act. After voting for the act, he called the economy "stunted" and a "burden" on Americans, adding, "The importance of this moment cannot be overstated. With the first comprehensive tax reform in 31 years, we will dramatically strengthen the U.S. economy and restore economic mobility and opportunity for hardworking individuals and families all across this country."

On May 19, 2021, Johnson and all other seven Republican House leaders in the 117th Congress voted against establishing a national commission to investigate the January 6, 2021 storming of the United States Capitol. Thirty-five Republican House members and all 217 Democrats present voted to establish such a commission.

After the 2022 midterm elections, representative Andy Biggs proposed Johnson as a possible compromise candidate for Speaker of the House instead of Republican Conference leader Kevin McCarthy, after members of the House Freedom Caucus opposed McCarthy's bid for the speakership. In 2023, he became chair of the House Judiciary Subcommittee on the Constitution and Limited Government.

Committee assignments
 Committee on the Judiciary
Subcommittee on the Constitution and Limited Government (Chair)
Subcommittee on Administrative State, Regulatory Reform, and Antitrust
Subcommittee on Courts, Intellectual Property and the Internet
Select Subcommittee on the Weaponization of the Federal Government
 Committee on Armed Services
Subcommittee on Readiness
Subcommittee on Cyber, Innovative Technologies and Information Systems

Caucus memberships 

 Freedom Caucus
Republican Study Committee

Political positions

Immigration 
Johnson supported President Donald Trump's 2017 executive order to prohibit immigration from seven predominantly Muslim countries, saying: "This is not an effort to ban any religion, but rather an effort to adequately protect our homeland. We live in a dangerous world, and this important measure will help us balance freedom and security."

Abortion 
Johnson opposes abortion and supports legislation to prohibit abortions after week 20 of a pregnancy.

Cannabis 
Johnson believes medical marijuana is a "gateway drug" to other drugs.

Donald Trump 
In 2019, Johnson said, "President Trump cooperated fully with the [Special Counsel Mueller] investigation."

Johnson served as a member of Trump's legal defense team during both the 2019 and 2020 Senate impeachment trials, which resulted in acquittals.

In December 2020, Johnson was one of 126 Republican members of the House of Representatives to sign an amicus brief in support of Texas v. Pennsylvania, a lawsuit filed at the United States Supreme Court contesting the results of the 2020 presidential election, in which Joe Biden defeated incumbent Donald Trump. The Supreme Court declined to hear the case on the basis that Texas lacked standing under Article III of the Constitution to challenge the results of an election held by another state.

LGBT rights 
Johnson opposed the results of Obergefell vs. Hodges, which legalized same-sex marriage across the US. He believes the decision should be state by state, not made by the Supreme Court. In 2022, Johnson introduced the Stop the Sexualization of Children Act, which would prohibit federally funded institutions, including public schools and libraries, from promoting or mentioning gender identity. The bill has been compared to Florida's "Don't Say Gay" act.

Government-sponsored school prayer
In April 2018, Johnson joined Republican state Attorney General Jeff Landry and Christian actor Kirk Cameron to argue under the First Amendment for student-led prayer and religious expression in public schools. Johnson and Landry appeared, with Cameron who spoke on a promotional video, at prayer rallies at the First Baptist Church of Minden and Bossier Parish Community College in Bossier City. The gatherings were organized by area pastors, including Brad Jurkovich of First Baptist Bossier, in response to a lawsuit filed in February against the Bossier Parish School Board and the superintendent, Scott Smith. Smith and the board were accused of permitting teachers to incorporate various aspects of Christianity in their class presentations.

Personal life
Johnson is married to Kelly Lary, a licensed Pastoral Counselor, a lecturer on family-related issues, and a former school teacher. They have four children. Johnson formerly resided in Shreveport, Baton Rouge, and in Allen, Collin County, Texas.

References

External links
 Congressman Mike Johnson official U.S. House website
 Campaign website
 
 
 

|-

|-

|-

|-

1972 births
21st-century American politicians
Alliance Defending Freedom people
American columnists
American anti-abortion activists
American talk radio hosts
American anti-same-sex-marriage activists
Baptists from Louisiana
Captain Shreve High School alumni
Living people
Louisiana lawyers
Louisiana State University Law Center alumni
Republican Party members of the Louisiana House of Representatives
People from Benton, Louisiana
Politicians from Shreveport, Louisiana
Protestants from Louisiana
Republican Party members of the United States House of Representatives from Louisiana
Southern Baptists
Baptists from the United States